Mih or MIH may refer to:

 Matilda International Hospital, a hospital in The Peak, Hong Kong
 Molar Incisor Hypomineralisation, Dentistry 
 Media independent handover, in wireless networking
 Müllerian inhibiting hormone
 Mills Hill railway station, England, National Rail station code
 Istarski mih, a Croatian bagpipe
 Musee International d'Horlogerie, a horology museum in La Chaux-de-Fonds, Switzerland